Rafael Ferrer may refer to:

 Rafael Ferrer (artist), Puerto Rican artist
 Rafael Ferrer (Jesuit) (1570–1611), Spanish Jesuit missionary and explorer